Begaana is a 1986 Bollywood drama movie directed by Ambrish Sangal and produced by S. S. Shivdasani.

Plot
Anand Mathur lives a middle-class lifestyle along with his sister, Asha, and retired Magistrate and widower father in Bombay's suburbs and studies in Mithibai College of Arts. He wins the college's annual singing competition, angering his nearest rival, Rama Kumar. He subsequently learns that Asha is in love with Rama's brother, Vinod, and arranges their marriage. After the marriage, he discovers that Vinod, Rama and their aunt, Leela, had expected a huge dowry, and on receiving none are now pressuring Asha to get some money and a fridge. Anand arranges for money and gets them a fridge. Vinod and his family then start to create misunderstandings between Asha and Anand albeit in vain. Vinod becomes more and more greedy and possessive about Asha and refuses to permit her to see her father and brother. When Anand's father passes away, Vinod manages to get a motorcycle from Anand but continues to create a barrier between brother and sister, so much so that Asha is convinced that Anand is up to no good. Then one day they learn that Anand has embezzled money from his employer, Vijaya Bank, Santa Cruz Branch. Subsequently, they learn that while absconding, Anand died in an accident. Quite unknown to them Anand is still alive and with the help of wealthy smuggler, Kailashnath Rana, whose life he saved, is now masquerading as Rana himself, has befriended and seduced Rama, married her and is all set to avenge his humiliation at Vinod's hands. Before he could complete his vendetta, he is abducted by Kailashnath's arch-enemy, A.P. Lall, and held until Kailashnath himself comes to negotiate his release.

Cast
 Kumar Gaurav as Anand Mathur / Kailashnath Rana 
 Rati Agnihotri as Rama Kumar / Rama K. Rana
 Dharmendra as Kailashnath Rana 
 Raj Kiran as Vinod Kumar
 Deepti Naval as Asha Mathur / Asha V. Kumar
 Amrish Puri as A.P. Lall
 Manmohan Krishna as Mr. Mathur
 Arun Bakshi as Vijaya Bank Branch Manager
 Mohan Choti as Ramanna 
 Aruna Irani as Leela
 Mac Mohan as Lall's assistant
 Om Shivpuri as Police Commissioner 
 Sudhir as Danny
 Kalpana Iyer as Dancer in club 
 Leena Das as Dancer in club
 Arjun Thapar as Dancer boy in club

Soundtrack
All lyrics were by Anjaan.

References

External links 
 
 Cult of Kumar

1986 films
1980s Hindi-language films
Films scored by Anu Malik
Indian drama films